Z Canis Majoris (Z CMa) is a B-type star in the constellation of Canis Major.  It has an average apparent visual magnitude of approximately 9.85, though has brightened by 1-2 magnitudes in irregular outbursts in 1987, 2000, 2004 and 2008.

The star is a complex binary system only 300,000 years old with two main components separated by an estimated 100 astronomical units (AU) or 0.1" as seen from Earth. The southeast component is an FU Orionis star (a type of pre-main-sequence star in a phase of very high mass accretion resulting in an accretion disk which dominates the optical spectrum) that is 1300 times as luminous as the Sun, has 3 times its mass and 13 times its diameter and a surface temperature of 10,000 K. The northwest component  is a Herbig Ae/Be star that has been calculated to be 12 times as massive as the Sun with 1690 times its diameter, and shining with 2400 times its luminosity, though there is some uncertainty about its properties. It is enveloped in an irregular roughly spherical cocoon of dust that has an inner diameter of 20 and outer diameter of 50 AU. The cocoon has a hole in it through which light shines that covers an angle of 5 to 10 degrees of its circumference. Both stars are surrounded by a large envelope of in-falling material that left over from the original cloud that formed the system. Both stars are emitting jets of material, that of the Herbig Ae/Be star being much larger - up to 11.7 light-years (3.6 parsecs) long.

It is unclear whether the most recent (and brightest) brightening in 2008 was due to the Herbig Ae/Be star increasing in luminosity or a hole appearing in the cocoon.

References

FU Orionis stars
Herbig Ae/Be stars
Canis Major
B-type stars
053179
034042
Canis Majoris, Z
Durchmusterung objects